Chungmu gimbap (충무김밥) is a gimbap made with only rice as the filler ingredient. Originating from the seaside city of Chungmu, the rolls are thinner and the surface is usually left unseasoned. Chungmu gimbap is traditionally served with side dishes of kolddugi muchim (꼴뚜기 무침), sliced baby octopus marinated and fermented in a spicy red pepper sauce, and radish kimchi (무김치).

References

Korean rice dishes